The 2016 RAN Women’s 10s was the inaugural tournament of the women's ten-a-side competition and was hosted at Miami, Florida from July 14th to the 15th. USA Rugby South Panthers were the inaugural champions after defeating Trinidad and Tobago in the final 31–22.

Table

Matches

Round 1

Round 2

Finals

References 

Women's rugby union competitions for national teams
Rugby union competitions in North America
Rugby union competitions in the Caribbean
Women's rugby union in North America
2016 in North American rugby union
2016 in American rugby union